Yul Kyung-Tae Moldauer (born August 26, 1996) is an American artistic gymnast. He is the 2017 U.S. national all-around champion and the 2017 World bronze medalist on floor exercise.  He represented the United States at the 2020 Summer Olympics.

Early life and education
Moldauer was born in Seoul, South Korea on August 16, 1996 and named Kyung-Tae. Before he was a year old, Peter Moldauer adopted him and named him Yul after the actor Yul Brynner. Because his biological mother was chemically dependent, his adoptive father was told he might not develop into a "productive adult."

Moldauer has three siblings, Leah, Sorcha and Sundo. He grew up on a farm in Colorado and attended Golden High School.

At age seven, Moldauer joined a local gym offering a free tryout, and at age ten, he joined 5280 Gymnastics, where he was coached by the Artemev family (Vladimir, Irina, and Alexander Artemev). In the next few years, he started winning state and regional meets, and eventually won a place on the Junior National Team. He was a member of the gymnastics team at the University of Oklahoma where he graduated in May 2020 with a degree in communications.

Moldauer has received two awards. In 2018, USA Gymnastics named him the 2018 Male Athlete of the Year. In April 2019, he was presented with the Nissen Emery Award, an annual prize given to the top male gymnast in the National Collegiate Athletic Association.

Junior career

In 2014, Moldauer won the junior title on the pommel horse at the U.S. National Championships. In 2015, he won the gold medal in the 18-year-old age division at the Junior Olympic National Championships.

In 2016, Moldauer won his first NCAA all-around title.

Senior career

2017
Moldauer competed at the 2017 Winter Cup where he won gold in the all-around, rings and parallel bars, and silver on floor and vault. He competed at his first top level international competition in March at the 2017 American Cup in Newark, New Jersey, where he placed first ahead of Olympic gold and silver medalist Oleg Vernyayev. Later that year, he became the NCAA champion on the floor exercise and rings, and placed second in the all-around and on parallel bars. In August, Moldauer won the all-around national title at the 2017 U.S. National Championships in Anaheim, California, and tied for the gold medal with Eddie Penev on floor exercise.

Moldauer made his first World Championship appearance at the 2017 World Championships in Montreal, Canada.  He won the bronze medal in the floor exercise final and placed 7th in the all-around final.

2018

Moldauer won his second consecutive American Cup all-around title in March at the 2018 American Cup  ahead of more accomplished gymnasts including Kenzō Shirai of Japan, the 2017 World all-around bronze medalist, thanks to Moldauer achieving a top three score on every apparatus. In August at the 2018 U.S. National Championships, he won the silver medal in the all-around behind Sam Mikulak.

In October, Moldauer competed at the 2018 World Championships in Doha, Qatar. He and the U.S. team finished fourth in the team competition. He went on to place 12th in the all-around final and fourth in the floor exercise final.

2019
Moldauer competed at the 2019 Winter Cup in Las Vegas, finishing first in the all-around. Moldauer won his third consecutive American Cup all-around title in March at the 2019 American Cup, just 0.001 of a point ahead of fellow American Sam Mikulak.

Moldauer suffered from right elbow pain and did not compete for six weeks.

In August at the 2019 U.S. National Championships, he again won the silver medal in the all-around behind Sam Mikulak. Additionally, he won silver medals on floor exercise and parallel bars.

2020
Moldauer competed at the 2020 Winter Cup in Las Vegas, finishing first on vault, third on parallel bars, fourth on pommel horse and fifth all-around. Due to his results at the Winter Cup Challenge, he was named to the 2020 senior men's team.

2021
Moldauer finished first on parallel bars, third all-around, third on floor, fourth on pommel horse and fifth on still rings at the 2021 Winter Cup Challenge in Indianapolis, Indiana. At 2021 U.S. Gymnastics Championships in Fort Worth, Texas he finished first on parallel bars, second all-around and third on floor and still rings. Moldauer was named to the 2020 Olympic team alongside Brody Malone, Sam Mikulak, and Shane Wiskus.  He secured his spot on the team by finishing second in the all-around and finishing in top three on at least three apparatuses at the 2020 Olympic Trials in St. Louis, Missouri.

In November Moldauer competed at the Arthur Gander Memorial.  He won the four-event all-around, beating Nikita Nagornyy in the tie-breaker.

2022 
Moldauer competed at the 2022 Winter Cup where he placed fourth in the all-around behind Vitaliy Guimaraes, Khoi Young, and Asher Hong.  As a result he was selected to represent the USA at the DTB Pokal Team Challenge in Stuttgart alongside Guimaraes, Young, Hong, and Brody Malone.

In June Moldauer was selected to represent the United States at the Pan American Championships alongside Riley Loos, Brody Malone, Colt Walker, and Shane Wiskus.  On the first day of competition Moldauer competed on all six events to help qualify the United States in first place to the team final.  Individually he won silver in the all-around behind Caio Souza of Brazil but won gold on floor exercise, pommel horse, and parallel bars.  During the team final Moldauer competed on floor, pommel horse, rings, and parallel bars to help the USA win gold ahead of the reigning team champion Brazil.

In August Moldauer competed at the U.S. National Championships.  He finished fifth in the all-around but recorded the third highest score when removing domestic bonuses.  Additionally he finished third on pommel horse.  In October Moldauer was named as the traveling alternate for the World Championships team.

Competitive history

References

External links
 
 

Living people
1996 births
American male artistic gymnasts
People from Arvada, Colorado
American adoptees
American sportspeople of Korean descent
South Korean adoptees
Oklahoma Sooners men's gymnasts
Gymnasts at the 2020 Summer Olympics
Olympic gymnasts of the United States
Medalists at the World Artistic Gymnastics Championships